Friends of Schneider is the official charity of Schneider Children's Medical Center of Israel.

History 
In 1992, the friends organisation, initiated by Prof. Haim Doron, began operating even before the establishment of hospital.

The first president of the association was Aura Herzog, the wife of Chaim Herzog who served at the time as the President of the State of Israel.

Activities 
Friends of Schneider is an association of friends which has been active on behalf of the Schneider Children's Medical Center of Israel since its inception in 1992.

It was established for the purpose of enhancing the development and advancement of the hospital and has, over the years, been instrumental in raising funds for construction, acquisition of medical equipment, research grants, and special projects and programs. Friends regularly arranges fundraising events in Israel in order to attain its goals. Efforts are currently focused on raising funds for the construction of the planned new building.

As a registered non-profit association, Friends of Schneider Children's is composed solely of volunteers - some of whom have been active since its inception who come from all walks of life including the business, public and social sectors. Contributions are directed towards the needs of Schneider Children’s as approved by hospital administration and the association.

See also 
 Schneider Children's Medical Center of Israel

Citations

External links
 Friends of Schneider - The Official Website
 Friends of Schneider on Facebook
 Friends of Schneider on Twitter
 Friends of Schneider on Instagram
 Friends of Schneider on YouTube

Pediatrics
Non-profit organizations based in Israel
Medical and health organizations based in Israel
Child welfare